In Greek mythology, Argyphia (Ancient Greek: Ἀργυφίης) was one of the multiple consorts of Aegyptus, king of Egypt. She was a woman of royal blood and by the latter, became the mother of six princes: Lynceus, Proteus, Busiris, Enceladus, Lycus and Daiphron. Her sons (except Lynceus) were married and murdered by their cousin-wives, daughters of King Danaus of Libya during their wedding night. The spared prince coupled with Hypermnestra and became the ancestors of famous Argives: Acrisius, Danae, Perseus, Heracles, etc.

According to Hippostratus, Aegyptus had his progeny by a single woman called Eurryroe, daughter of the river-god Nilus. In some accounts, he consorted with Isaie, daughter of his uncle Agenor, king of Tyre.

Notes

References 
 Apollodorus, The Library with an English Translation by Sir James George Frazer, F.B.A., F.R.S. in 2 Volumes, Cambridge, MA, Harvard University Press; London, William Heinemann Ltd. 1921. ISBN 0-674-99135-4. Online version at the Perseus Digital Library. Greek text available from the same website.
Tzetzes, John, Book of Histories, Book VII-VIII translated by Vasiliki Dogani from the original Greek of T. Kiessling's edition of 1826. Online version at theio.com

Queens in Greek mythology